Maciachini is an underground station on Line 3 of the Milan Metro which opened on December 8, 2003, thirteen years after the opening of the original trunk of the line. This station was the northern terminus of the line until March 26, 2011, with the extension of the line to Comasina.

The station is located at Piazzale Carlo Maciachini on the Milan Ring Road, in the municipality of Milan.

References

Line 3 (Milan Metro) stations
Railway stations opened in 2003